In aviation, rotation refers to the action of applying back pressure to a control device, such as a yoke, side-stick or centre stick, to lift the nose wheel off the ground during takeoff. The aircraft rotates around its lateral axis. Rotation is begun at the speed known as VR. Rotation at the correct speed and to the correct angle is important for safety reasons and to decrease takeoff distance. After rotation, the aircraft continues to accelerate until it reaches its liftoff speed VLO, at which point it leaves the runway. Over-rotation can cause a tailstrike, which can damage the underside of the tail unless prevented by a protection device such as a tailskid or tail bumper. A certification test is required to show that a new aircraft design will still take off safely with the tail dragging on the runway. Using a higher VR will increase tail clearance and reduce the probability of tailstrike.

Description
Rotation applies to tricycle gear aircraft rather than those with conventional gear (tailwheel aircraft). The on-ground angle of attack of the wing has to be established during the design phase. The main and nose-gear leg lengths are chosen to give a negative angle of attack relative to the ground. This ensures the wing will have negative lift until the pilot rotates the aircraft to a positive angle of attack. During landing, the reverse happens when the nose-wheel touches the runway and the wing assumes a negative angle of attack with no lift.

For aircraft with a tailwheel, the pilot initially pushes forward on the yoke during the takeoff run, lifting the tailwheel off the runway, and the aircraft lifts off the runway once sufficient speed is achieved.

References

Flight phases